Guo Tong (born 19 February 2002) is a Chinese footballer currently playing as a goalkeeper for Ji'nan Xingzhou, on loan from Shanghai Port.

Career statistics

Club
.

References

2002 births
Living people
Chinese footballers
China youth international footballers
Association football goalkeepers
Shanghai Port F.C. players